Tú y yo (English: You and I) is a Mexican telenovela produced by Emilio Larrosa for Televisa in 1996.

On Wednesday, September 9, 1996, Canal de las Estrellas started broadcasting Tú y yo weekdays at 9:30pm, replacing Cañaveral de Pasiones. The last episode was broadcast on Thursday, March 20, 1997.

Maribel Guardia and Joan Sebastian starred as protagonists, while Olga Breeskin, Itatí Cantoral, Arleth Terán and Claudio Báez starred as antagonists. Francisco Gattorno, Lola Merino, Arath de la Torre and Sebastián Ligarde starred as stellar performances.

Cast 
 
Maribel Guardia as Estela Díaz-Infante de Santillana
Joan Sebastian as Tomás Santillana
Olga Breeskin as Lucrecia Álvarez Albarran
Itatí Cantoral as Cassandra Santillana Álvarez
Francisco Gattorno as Ricardo Vásquez
Lola Merino as Alicia Santillana Díaz-Infante
Sebastián Ligarde as Arturo Álvarez
Claudio Báez as Roberto Álvarez Albarran
Ramón Valdés Urtiz as Fernando Santillana Díaz-Infante
Anahí as Melissa Álvarez
Alfredo Adame as Carlos Augusto Beltran Hinojosa
Lourdes Munguía as Alejandra
Maribel Fernández as Doña Graciela "Chelo" López Beristain
César Bono as Ciriaco "El Toques"
José Ángel García as Juan José Iturralde
Anel as Laura/Elena Campos
Juan Carlos Casasola as Gonzalo
José Flores as Wilfredo Díaz
María Montejo as Cleofas
Lisette Morelos as Linda López
Arleth Terán as Bárbara Camacho Urrea
Arath de la Torre as Javier Álvarez Albarran/Saúl Gutiérrez
José Joel as Francisco "Paco" Vásquez
Silvia Eugenia Derbez as Yolanda Vásquez
Ana María Aguirre as Virginia de Vásquez
Mónika Sánchez as Martha
Carlos Rotzinger as Adolfo Montemayor
Ana Luisa Peluffo as Catalina Vda. de Díaz-Infante
Andrea García as Lucrecia (young)
Marlene Favela as Luisa Marcano Rojas
Alejandro Ávila as Tomás (young)
Jorge Poza as Humberto
Roxana Castellanos as Elizabeth
Bobby Larios as Sebastián Domínguez
Scarlet Gruber as Isabel Morelos
Galilea Montijo as Resignacion del Carmen

Awards

References

External links

1996 telenovelas
Mexican telenovelas
1996 Mexican television series debuts
1997 Mexican television series endings
Spanish-language telenovelas
Television shows set in Mexico City
Televisa telenovelas